Hwaetberht (died 740s) was abbot of Monkwearmouth-Jarrow Priory, where he had served as a monk.

He was elected to succeed Abbot Ceolfrith in 716 or 717 when Ceolfrith set off on a pilgrimage to Rome. Bede reports that Hwaetberht had himself made a pilgrimage to Rome, "and had stayed there a good long while, learning, copying down and bringing back with him all that he thought necessary for his studies" during the papacy of Sergius I (687–701). Bede's De temporum ratione is dedicated to Hwaetberht, so Bede appears to have regarded him highly. A letter from Saint Boniface to Hwaetberht dated to circa 747 has survived in the Boniface Correspondence, placing Hwaetberht's death after that date. In the letter (Tangl 76), Boniface asks Hwaetberth to send him "the treatises of the monk Bede, that profound student of the Scriptures"; he also asks him to send him a cloak: "it would be of great comfort to me in my journeys". In return, he sent Hwaetberht a "coverlet" made of goat hair.

It was during Hwaetberht's time that the remains of Abbots Sigfrith and Eosterwine were reburied alongside those of Benedict Biscop next to the main altar at Monkwearmouth.

In the preface to the fourth book of his commentary on I Samuel (In primam partem Samuhelis), Bede associates Hwaetberht with the Latinate name Eusebius, which seems therefore to have been an alternative name taken by Hwaetberht (citing Bede, De natura rerum, ed. D. Hurst, CCSL 119 (Turnhout 1962) 212.). For this reason, it has been inferred that Hwaetberht was the author of a collection of sixty Latin riddles known as the Enigmata Eusebii. These were written as a supplement to forty riddles written earlier by Tatwine, Archbishop of Canterbury.

References

 Bede, Lives of the Abbots of Wearmouth and Jarrow in Webb and Farmer (eds & trs), The Age of Bede. London: Penguin, 1998. 
 Lapidge, M., "Hwaetberht", in M. Lapidge et al., The Blackwell Encyclopedia of Anglo-Saxon England. Blackwell, 1999. 
Bede, Lives of the Abbots of Wearmouth and Jarrow

External links
 

Anglo-Saxon writers
Abbots of Jarrow
740s deaths
Burials at Glastonbury Abbey
Year of birth unknown
7th-century English writers
8th-century English writers
8th-century Latin writers